Henry Braun (born c. 1950) is a Canadian politician and businessman. He served as the mayor of Abbotsford, British Columbia from 2014 to 2022.

Braun was born in Paraguay where he lived with his family until he was three and a half, when they first moved to Steinbach, Manitoba and then to Abbotsford. His parents were Russian Mennonite refugees from the Mennonite colonies of southern Ukraine who fled to Paraguay during World War II. Before entering politics, Braun was a rancher and the CEO Pacific Northern Rail Contractors Corp.

Braun was first elected as a city councillor in Abbotsford in the 2011 municipal election. As a councillor, Braun was known for his lone opposing votes, with mayor Bruce Banman calling him "(not) a team player". He ran for mayor in 2014, defeating Banman by just over 600 votes. Braun ran on a platform of "fiscal responsibility" and "better accountability" in local government. He received some controversy in his run, as his son was director of development planning for the city, causing a possible conflict of interest. In his campaign, he won the endorsements of former mayors George Ferguson and Dave Kandal.

Braun was re-elected mayor in the 2018 mayoral election, defeating long-time city councillor Moe Gill and accountant Eric Nyvall, taking 57% of the vote.

Braun did not run for re-election in 2022.

Personal life
Braun is married to Velma Braun, and has three children.

References

External links 
City of Abbotsford biography

Living people
Mayors of Abbotsford, British Columbia
Businesspeople from British Columbia
Paraguayan emigrants to Canada
Canadian ranchers
People from Steinbach, Manitoba
Canadian Mennonites
Year of birth missing (living people)
Paraguayan Mennonites